Fabrice LeClerc (born 28 April 1968) is a French rower. He competed at the 1992 Summer Olympics and the 1996 Summer Olympics.

References

External links
 

1968 births
Living people
French male rowers
Olympic rowers of France
Rowers at the 1992 Summer Olympics
Rowers at the 1996 Summer Olympics
Sportspeople from Aube